Randolph County Courthouse or Old Randolph County Courthouse may refer to:

Old Randolph County Courthouse (Arkansas), Pocahontas, Arkansas
Randolph County Courthouse (Arkansas), Pocahontas, Arkansas
Randolph County Courthouse (Illinois), Chester, Illinois
Randolph County Courthouse (North Carolina), Asheboro, North Carolina
Randolph County Courthouse and Jail, Elkins, West Virginia